Arctic Red River Water Aerodrome, formerly , was a seasonal airstrip adjacent to Arctic Red River, Northwest Territories, Canada on the MacKenzie River and was open from the middle of June until the middle of October.

References

Airports in the Arctic
Defunct seaplane bases in the Northwest Territories